The Combat Organization (or the Fighting Organization) was the terrorist branch within the Social Revolutionary Party of Russia. It was a terror sub-group that was given autonomy under that Party.  In his memoirs, group member Boris Savinkov called the group the "Terrorist Brigade." (This phrasing was followed in his own memoirs by Whittaker Chambers, an American spy for the Soviets.)

History
In 1902, Grigory Gershuni founded and led the group. In July 1904 they murdered the Russian Minister of the Interior, Vyacheslav von Plehve.

In 1904, Gershuni was arrested, and Yevno Azef succeeded him, with Boris Savinkov as his deputy.  Azef, a double-agent in the employ of the Tsarist secret police Okhrana, changed the Terrorist Brigade's mode of attack from firearms to dynamite.
In its middle period (1903–1906) the brigade's members included more than a dozen women and more than four dozen men—some nobles, honorary citizens, priests, and merchants.  Most were 20–30 years old; 19 Jews, and two Poles.
In 1908, Savinkov succeeded Azef, but the group disbanded shortly thereafter.

Members
 Grigory Gershuni
 Yevno Azef (also "Evno" and "Azev"/"Azeff" and "Yevno Asiev")
 Boris Savinkov (also "Savinkoff")
 Mikhail Melnikov
 Stepan Balmashov
 Thomas Kachura
 Igor Sazonov (also "Yegor" or "Egor" and "Sozonov")
 Ivan Kalyayev ("Kaliaev" in the 1931 translation of Savinkov's Memoirs of a Terrorist)
 Sikorsky
 Borishansky
 Dulebov
 Shveitser (also "Schweitser"/"Schweizer")
 Karl Trauberg

Assassination efforts

Assassinations
 1902: Dmitry Sipyagin
 1904: Vyacheslav von Plehve
 1905: Grand Duke Sergei Alexandrovich of Russia
 Nicholas Bogdanovich (governor of Ufa)
 1906: Vladimir von der Launitz

Failed assassinations
 Konstantin Pobedonostsev
 Nicholas Kleigels
 Fyodor Dubasov
 Ivan Mikhailovich Obolensky

See also
 Socialist Revolutionary Party
 1905 Russian Revolution
 Terrorism in Russia
 Bolshevik Military Organizations
 PSP Combat organization
 The Just Assassins

References

External sources
 Boris Savinkov, Memoirs of a Terrorist (New York: Boni, 1931)/Воспоминания террориста (1917) .
 Albert Camus, The Just Assassins / Les Justes (Paris: Gallimard 1950)

1905 Russian Revolution
Military wings of socialist parties
Socialist Revolutionary Party
Terrorism in the Russian Empire